The Croatian Bureau of Statistics ( or DZS) is the Croatian national statistics bureau.

History 
The bureau was formed in 1875 in Austria-Hungary as the Zemaljski statistički ured for the Kingdom of Croatia, Slavonia and Dalmatia.

In 1924, the bureau was renamed to the Statistical Office in Zagreb (Statistički ured u Zagrebu). In 1929, after royal monarchy was proclaimed in the Kingdom of Serbs, Croats and Slovenes the bureau lost its financial and technical independence.

In 1939 with the formation of the Banovina of Croatia, the office was made subject to the presidential office on the Ban's administration. In 1941 the Independent State of Croatia was formed and an Office of General State Statistics existed during this time under the control of the presidential government.

In 1945 the Statistical Office of the People's Republic of Croatia was formed. In 1951 it was renamed to the Bureau of Statistics and Evidence, in 1956 to the Bureau of Statistics of the People's Republic of Croatia and in 1963 to the Republican Bureau for Statistics of the Socialist Republic of Croatia.

The bureau was independent during this time, but was subordinated to the Yugoslavian Federal Bureau for Statistics.

Upon Croatian independence, the Central Bureau of Statistics was made the highest statistical body in the nation.

Work
The bureau collects and processes data for the Republic of Croatia. Among other things, the bureau conducts the Croatian census.

The Bureau keeps records on Croatian censuses since 1857, including the recent:
 1991 Croatian census
 2001 Croatian census
 2011 Croatian census

References

External links

Organizations established in 1875
Government agencies of Croatia
Croatia
Donji grad, Zagreb
Organizations based in Zagreb
1875 establishments in Austria-Hungary